Abu Abdallah Muhammad az-Zaghal (the Valiant) ( 1444 –  1494) was the 23rd Nasrid ruler of Granada in Spain. Christians called him Mahoma XIII el Zagal.

Life
Muhammad fought in the Granada War next to his brother Abu'l-Hasan Ali, also known as "Muley Hacén".

He succeeded his brother in 1485. He abdicated in 1486. After passing the throne to his nephew Muhammad XII, also known as Boabdil, el Zagal ruled over a fractured remnant of the kingdom in its last days.

When Muhammad XII surrendered the Alhambra Palace to the Catholic Monarchs, el Zagal left for North Africa to gather an army. There he was imprisoned by the ruler of the Wattasid dynasty, Boabdil's friend, who ordered to blind him.

He presumably died in north-western Algeria, in Tlemcen, in 1494.

References 
 Harvey, Leonard Patrick (1992), Islamic Spain 1250 to 1500, University of Chicago Press
 Irving, Washington (1832), Tales of the Alhambra, Éditions Phébus, 1998 (online edition)

External links 
 Nasrid dynasty, Granada (1237-1492)
 Nasrid dynasty of Granada  بنو نصر/النصريون/بنو الأحمر في غرناطة
- Requiem for Granada, TV show.

Sultans of Granada
1440s births
1490s deaths
15th-century monarchs in Europe
15th century in Al-Andalus
15th-century Arabs